Bucay (also known as General Antonio Elizalde) is a town located on the eastern edge of Guayas, Ecuador, near the Chimborazo province. It is the seat of General Antonio Elizalde Canton (Bucay Canton). As of the census of 2001, there are 8,690 people residing within canton limits. This canton is one of the newest in Guayas, as it was created in 1995.

Populated places in Guayas Province